The Westerwald Lakes lie within the eponymous Westerwald Lake District (Westerwälder Seenplatte) in the Westerwald forest within the town quarters of Hachenburg, Westerburg, Montabaur and Dierdorf in the German state of Rhineland-Palatinate.

The lakes consist of seven ponds:
 Brinkenweiher
 Haidenweiher
 Hausweiher
 Hoffmannsweiher
 Postweiher
 Dreifelder Weiher (also Seeweiher)
 Wölferlinger Weiher

At 123 hectares, the Dreifelder Weiher is the largest.

References

External links 
 Westerwald Lakes Development Association (Entwicklungsverband Westerwälder Seenplatte)

Protected landscapes in Germany
Lakes of Rhineland-Palatinate
!
Rhineland